Monmouth is an unincorporated community in Root Township, Adams County, in the U.S. state of Indiana.

History
A post office was established at Monmouth in 1839, and remained in operation until it was discontinued in 1904. The community was named after Monmouth County, New Jersey.

Geography

References

Unincorporated communities in Adams County, Indiana
Unincorporated communities in Indiana
1839 establishments in Indiana